John Richard Bond  (born 1950 in Toronto, Ontario), also known as J. Richard Bond, is a Canadian astrophysicist and cosmologist.

Bond received his bachelor's degree in 1973 from the University of Toronto and his PhD in theoretical physics in 1979 from Caltech under the supervision of William A. Fowler. Beginning in 1985 he has been a professor at the Canadian Institute for Theoretical Astrophysics (CITA) and at the University of Toronto. He served 2 five-year terms (1996–2006) as CITA's director, and since 2002 he has been the director of the Cosmology and Gravity Program for the Canadian Institute for Advanced Research (CIFAR).

Bond's most famous work concerns the theoretical modeling of anisotropies of the cosmic background radiation. Since the 1990s increasingly detailed measurements of such anisotropies have enabled such theoretical models to form a basis for understanding the foundations of contemporary cosmology and the evolution of cosmic structure.

Honours and awards
 1969 space award
 1989 Steacie Prize 
 1996 FRSC
 1996 Beals Award, Canadian Astronomical Society
 1998 CAP-CRM Prize in Theoretical and Mathematical Physics
 2001 FRS
 2002 Dannie Heineman Prize for Astrophysics
 2005 Officer in the Order of Canada
 2006 Gerhard Herzberg Canada Gold Medal for Science and Engineering
 2007 Killam Award
 2008 Gruber Prize in Cosmology
 2009 Tory Medal
 2020 Elected a Legacy Fellow of the American Astronomical Society in 2020

References

External links
Homepage of Dick Bond at U. of Toronto
j. richard bond - Google Scholar Citations
J. Richard Bond, Microsoft Academic Search

1950 births
Living people
20th-century Canadian astronomers
21st-century Canadian astronomers
California Institute of Technology alumni
Canadian astrophysicists
Canadian Fellows of the Royal Society
Fellows of the Royal Society of Canada
Members of the Order of Ontario
Officers of the Order of Canada
Scientists from Toronto
University of Toronto alumni
Academic staff of the University of Toronto
Winners of the Dannie Heineman Prize for Astrophysics
Foreign associates of the National Academy of Sciences
Fellows of the American Astronomical Society